The president of the Council of Ministers, colloquially referred to as the prime minister, is the head of the cabinet and the head of government of Poland. The responsibilities and traditions of the office stem from the creation of the contemporary Polish state, and the office is defined in the Constitution of 1997. According to the Constitution, the president nominates and appoints the prime minister, who will then propose the composition of the Cabinet. Fourteen days following their appointment, the prime minister must submit a programme outlining the government's agenda to the Sejm, requiring a vote of confidence. Conflicts stemming from both interest and powers have arisen between the offices of President and Prime Minister in the past.

The incumbent and seventeenth prime minister is Mateusz Morawiecki of the Law and Justice party. Morawiecki replaced Prime Minister Beata Szydło, who resigned on 7 December 2017.

Origin of the office

Second Republic

Near the end of the First World War, an assortment of groups contested to proclaim an independent Polish state. In early November 1918, a socialist provisional government under Ignacy Daszyński declared independence, while a separate committee in Kraków claimed to rule West Galicia. In Warsaw, the German-Austrian appointed Regency Council agreed to transfer political responsibilities to Marshal Józef Piłsudski, recently released from Magdeburg fortress, as Chief of State of the new Polish nation. Piłsudski summoned Daszyński to the capital to form a government, where Piłsudski agreed to appoint Daszyński as the republic's first prime minister. Daszyński's premiership, however, remained brief, after the politician failed to form a workable coalition. Piłsudski turned instead to Jędrzej Moraczewski, who successfully crafted a workable government for the Second Republic's first months of existence.

The Small Constitution of 1919 outlined Poland's form of government, with a democratically elected Sejm, a prime minister and cabinet, and an executive branch. Despite outlining a parliamentary system, the Small Constitution vested many executive powers into Piłsudski's position as Chief of State. The executive branch could select and organize cabinets (with the Sejm's consent), be responsible to the ministries for their duties, and require the countersignature of ministers for all official acts. By the early 1920s, rightist nationalists within parliament, particularly Roman Dmowski and other members of the Popular National Union party and the Endecja movement, advocated reforms to the republic's structure to stem the authority of the chief of state (and ultimately Piłsudski) while increasing parliamentary powers. The result was the Sejm's passage of the March Constitution of 1921. Modeled after the Third French Republic, the March Constitution entrusted decision-making exclusively within the lower-house Sejm. The newly created presidency, on the other hand, became a symbolic office devoid of any major authority, stripped of veto and wartime powers.

Deriving authority from the powerful Sejm, the prime minister and the council of ministers, in theory, faced few constitutional barriers from the presidency to pass and proceed with legislation. In reality, however, the premiership remained extraordinarily insecure due to the harsh political climate of the early Second Republic, marked by constant fluctuating coalitions within parliament. Fourteen governments and eleven prime ministers rose and fell between 1918 and 1926, with nine governments alone serving between the five-year March Constitution era. Deeply frustrated with the republic's chaotic "sejmocracy" parliamentary structure, Piłsudski led rebellious Polish Army units to overthrow the government in the May Coup of 1926, effectively ending the Second Republic's brief experiment with parliamentary democracy, as well as the prime minister's free and popular elected mandate for the next sixty years.

Distrustful of parliamentary democracy, Marshal Piłsudski and his Sanation movement assumed a semi-authoritarian power behind the throne presence over the premiership and presidency. Piłsudski's August Novelization of the 1921 Constitution retained the prime minister's post and the parliamentary system, though modified the president's powers to rule by decree, dismiss the Sejm, and decide budgetary matters. By the mid-1930s, Piłsudski and fellow Sanationists further stripped parliament and the premier's powers by enacting a new constitution, effectively establishing a strong "hyper-presidency" by 1935. The new constitution allowed for the president to dismiss parliament, the right to freely appoint and dismiss the prime minister, members of the cabinet and the judiciary at will, and promulgated the presidency as the supreme power of the state. Until the outbreak of the Second World War and the resulting exiling of the Polish government, the Sanation movement remained at the helm of a government dominated by the presidency with a weak, subordinate prime minister.

People's Republic
Under the communist Polish People's Republic, the ruling Polish United Workers' Party (PZPR) dominated all sections of the government, as recognized under the 1952 Constitution. Although the premiership continued to exist, the office's power and prestige relied more on the individual's stature within the governing communist party than the position's actual constitutional authority. The office acted as an administrative agent for policies carried out by the PZPR's Politburo, rather than relying on the support of the rubber stamp Sejm. In face of growing protests from the Solidarity movement for much of the 1980s, the PZPR entered into the Round Table Talks in early 1989 with leading members of the anti-communist opposition. The conclusion of the talks, along with the resulting April Novelization of the constitution, provided various powers to the Sejm, along with reinstating both the previously dissolved upper-house Senat and the presidency as legal governmental entities.

Third Republic

Following the partially free 1989 parliamentary election, the Solidarity government of Tadeusz Mazowiecki faced the monumental task of formally institutionalizing the office in order to define its relatively vague legal powers. As the communist state was quickly dismantled, this impasse remained due to the series of unstable governments falling in quick succession in the first years of the Third Republic. Matters were not helped by the vagueness of the presidency, whose recreation during the Round Table Talks left a poorly defined yet potentially powerful office. After Lech Wałęsa's direct 1990 election to the presidency, a tug of war between the offices of the premier and presidency regarding the powers of the two offices began, with Wałęsa arguing for increased presidential powers by drafting a new constitution, with the right to appoint and dismiss the prime minister and members of the cabinet. Although Wałęsa later recanted his attempts to create a presidential system, the president continued to advocate for a semi-presidential model similar to that of the Fifth French Republic. The passage of the Small Constitution in 1992, which dispensed with the communist 1952 document, clarified several presidential prerogatives over the prime minister, including the president's right to be consulted on the ministers of Defense, Foreign Affairs and Interior. Although Wałęsa enjoyed a conflict free relationship with Prime Minister Hanna Suchocka, power rifts remained after the Small Constitution's passage, particularly with the Sejm, which Wałęsa repeatedly attempted to dissolve, influence its appointments and shift its constitutional reform agenda towards the presidency's favour.

However, by the 1993 parliamentary election, which brought in a relatively stable left-of-centre coalition government between the Democratic Left Alliance (SLD) and the Polish People's Party (PSL), as well as Wałęsa's defeat in the 1995 presidential election by SdRP challenger Aleksander Kwaśniewski, an impetus for greater constitutional reform began to proceed. Between 1996 and 1997, a series of reform laws passed through parliament, strengthening and centralizing the prime minister's prerogatives. These reforms would form the basis of the current 1997 Constitution. Significant changes included the ability for the prime minister to call a vote of confidence, the premier's exclusive right to allocate and reshuffle ministers, and also for the prime minister to solely determine the areas of competence for ministries. Many of the prime minister's new powers were gained at the expense of the presidency, which lost the rights to consult ministerial appointments, reject the prime minister's cabinet selection or reshuffles, chair the cabinet, and to veto the budget, although veto powers in other areas remained. Additionally, the previous communist-era Office of the Council of Ministers (Urząd Rady Ministrów) was reformed into the Chancellery in 1997 to act as the premier's executive central office and support staff, assisting the facilitation and coordination of policy among members of the cabinet. The reforms between 1996 and 1997, codified under the constitution, made the prime minister the centre of legal authority within the government.

Selection and responsibilities

Appointment

According to Article 154 of the Constitution of Poland, the president must nominate the prime minister to the post. However, the nomination process is not solely dictated by presidential preference, it rather reflects the leader of the party which obtained the most seats in the previous parliamentary election, or the leader agreed upon by a coalition. The president is neither entitled to dismiss the prime minister, appoint nor dismiss individual members of the cabinet, or the council of ministers as a whole at will. Upon selection, the prime minister will propose members of the cabinet, and within fourteen days, must submit a program outlining the new government's agenda to the Sejm, requiring a vote of confidence from its deputies. In the event that a vote of confidence fails, the process of government formation passes to the Sejm, which will then nominate a prime minister within fourteen days, who will again propose the composition of the cabinet. An absolute majority of votes in the presence of at least half of all Sejm deputies is required to approve the cabinet, which the president will then accept and administer the oath of office. If the vote of confidence fails again, the process of nomination is handed back to the presidency, who will appoint a prime minister, who will then nominate other members of the cabinet. If the vote of confidence fails a third time, the president is obliged to shorten the Sejm's term of office and call for new elections.

As part of political tradition, the prime minister and the ministers take the oath of office inside the Column Hall at the Presidential Palace, in a ceremony administered by the president. Upon their inauguration, the prime minister and the ministers must take the following pledge before the head of state:

 The oath may also be finished with the additional sentence, "So help me God."

Role in the cabinet and powers
Article 148 of the constitution stipulates that the prime minister shall act as the representative of the cabinet as a whole, delegate its agendas, coordinate the work of ministers, ensure the implementation of policy adopted by the cabinet, and issue regulations. Additionally, the prime minister acts as the superior of all civil servants. The prime minister is further assisted by a deputy prime minister (or ministers), who will act as a vice-president within the council of ministers. The make-up of the cabinet, its distributed portfolios and its governing style, however, very much depends on the premier's personality. The prime minister cannot, however, hold the presidency nor any other high state office, such as the chairmanships of the Supreme Chamber of Control, the National Bank of Poland, or the Ombudsman for Citizens Rights, simultaneously. With the power to distribute and reshuffle cabinet members, the prime minister can also discharge the functions of a minister. Similarly, the prime minister can call upon the cabinet to repeal a regulation or order from any minister.

The prime minister must answer questions from deputies during each sitting of the Sejm. The premier and other ministers are also constitutionally mandated to answer interpellations from deputies within 21 days of their submission.

In accordance to Poland's semi-presidential system, most official acts of the presidency require the prime minister's countersignature in order to become valid. Through this, the prime minister acts as a gatekeeper to the president to certain acts, while also accepting responsibility to the Sejm for the president's actions. This legal relationship, established under the constitution, attaches a significant presidential dependence on the prime minister's signature, arguably enlarging the premier's responsibilities and legal standing. The President, however, does not need the prime minister's countersignature for a limited selection of other acts, including the appointment of judges, conferring orders and decorations, appointing a president to the Supreme Court of Poland, exercising pardons, making a referral to the Constitutional Tribunal, or appointing members to the National Broadcasting Council. The presidency's most significant power over the prime minister is the right to veto the government's legislation, but this procedure may be overruled by a three-fifths voting majority in the Sejm.

The prime minister can also submit a vote of confidence of their cabinet to the Sejm. A vote of confidence in the cabinet can be granted by at least half of all of the Sejm's deputies. Similarly, if the council of ministers loses its majority support within the Sejm, the cabinet can be forced to resign in a constructive vote of no confidence. The motion must be approved by at least 46 deputies, and then passed by a majority vote. In such an event, a new prime minister must be simultaneously appointed.  Additionally, the premier must submit the resignation of their cabinet at the first sitting of a newly elected parliament, as well as after a vote of no confidence has been successfully passed against the council of ministers or upon their own individual resignation. In the event of the prime minister's resignation or death, the president can either accept or refuse the cabinet's resignation of office.

For the regional governments of the voivodeships, the prime minister is empowered to appoint a voivode for each of the republic's sixteen provinces, who supervises the central government's administration in the regions, as well as the functions of local government. The Sejm, upon a motion of the prime minister, can dissolve a local or regional government if it is flagrantly violating the constitution or legal statutes.

Among the office's emergency and security powers, the prime minister can request to the president a military commander-in-chief of the Polish Armed Forces during a time of war, or order a partial or general mobilization in the event of a direct threat to national security. The prime minister also retains the right to appoint and dismiss the heads of the special services, including the Policja, the Border Guard, the ABW, the AW, and the Government Protection Bureau. The heads of both the ABW and AW are entitled to directly report to the premier. In the event of public disorder, the prime minister can, upon a motion by the interior minister, authorize special armed units of the Policja to restore order. If such units prove ineffective in such a situation, the prime minister is authorized to call upon the president to deploy the Polish Armed Forces to bring law and order.

Relationship with the presidency
Throughout the history of the Third Republic, the relationship between the prime minister and the president has ebbed and flowed. In the early to mid-1990s, the relationship largely depended on different interpretations of the vague, legal prerogatives of each office at the time, though since the passage of the Constitution of 1997, political preferences and individual personalities have characterized the relationship. Conflicts between the two offices, however, have generated party splits and political paralysis in the past.

Both before and after his 1990 election to the presidency, Lech Wałęsa had a deeply strained relationship with Prime Minister Tadeusz Mazowiecki, stemming from Wałęsa's belief that Mazowiecki was not aggressive enough in the dismissal of former Polish United Workers' Party members from senior government and economic positions. Mazowiecki's famous 1989 Thick Line speech (gruba kreska) further exacerbated the splintering. The split between the two men fractured the original uniting Solidarity Citizens' Committee by 1990, with intellectuals supporting Mazowiecki's new Citizens' Movement for Democratic Action, while workers supported the Centre Agreement, a political movement based around Wałęsa.

Similarly, Prime Minister Jan Olszewski also retained a notoriously strained relationship with President Wałęsa during Olszewski's brief government between 1991 and 1992. Olszewski proceeded with a cautious approach to economic reform instead of implementing shock therapy, putting him at odds with the president. While Wałęsa advocated for constitutional reform to enlarge presidential prerogatives over the prime minister, Olszewski launched a campaign to deliberately embarrass the president and undermine Wałęsa's stature, releasing a list of alleged ex-communist collaborators within the Sejm, with some conspirators linked to the president. Wałęsa was further infuriated by Olszewski's attempts to gain influence within the Polish Armed Forces by appointing Radosław Sikorski as deputy defense minister without consultation. Wałęsa repeatedly called for the Olszewski government's dismissal, which the Sejm obliged, forcing the collapse of Olszewski's coalition in June 1992. Prime Minister Hanna Suchocka, who succeeded in forming a government after Waldemar Pawlak's failure to gather a workable coalition, enjoyed a far more amicable relationship with the president.

The implementation of a new constitution in 1997 profoundly affected the relationship between the premiership and the presidency. Uncertainties over presidential and prime ministerial power that marked the Third Republic's first years were removed, eliminating the ability of the president to fully disrupt the government, and further strengthening the prime minister's position. Under President Aleksander Kwaśniewski, Prime Minister Jerzy Buzek's government became the first administration to be elected under the new constitution. Despite being from opposite parties (Kwaśniewski's center-left Social Democracy of the Republic of Poland and Buzek's center-right Solidarity Electoral Action), the relationship between both offices was smooth, partly due to Kwaśniewski's non-confrontational personality. Kwaśniewski sparingly used his veto powers in legislation the president did not agree with, choosing to let the government's concordat with the Holy See, a new lustration act and new electoral statutes to proceed without hindrance, though Kwaśniewski vetoed Buzek's privatization plan. Kwaśniewski's relationships with the like-minded social democratic premierships of Leszek Miller and Marek Belka were virtually free of conflict.

Relations between the two executive organs, however, returned to animosity under the presidency of Lech Kaczyński and Prime Minister Donald Tusk. Political rivals for years, fueled by the 2005 presidential poll which saw both men as the main challengers, Tusk's center-right Civic Platform toppled President Kaczyński's twin brother Jarosław's government in the 2007 parliamentary election. Tusk's support for stronger integration into the European Union, including the signing of the Lisbon Treaty, and a rapprochement with Russia, put Kaczyński directly at odds with the prime minister. From 2007 until Kaczyński's death in the Smolensk air disaster in 2010, policy differences between the two offices were a constant source of division, with the president employing his limited veto powers numerous times over the government's legislation; Tusk's government lacked a 60 percent threshold to overturn such vetoes. In response, Tusk made no secret his party's desire to replace Kaczyński in the 2010 presidential election. Although Tusk and Kaczyński found several areas of compromise, clashes between the Chancellery and the Presidential Palace became a regular feature in both the domestic and international political scenes for the next two and a half years. Frustrated by Kaczyński's veto, Prime Minister Tusk argued for a constitutional amendment in November 2009 to strip the presidency of its veto powers, declaring: "The president should not have veto power. People make their decision in elections and then state institutions should not be in conflict...Let us change some provisions so we can have fewer conflicts and more cooperation. We propose changes to the constitution so that the centre of power lies with the government... The presidential veto brings more harm than good."

Currently, both President Andrzej Duda and Prime Minister Mateusz Morawiecki originate from the Law and Justice party.

Support staff and residence

The prime minister's executive office is the Chancellery. Located along Ujazdów Avenue in Warsaw, the Chancellery houses the central meeting location of the cabinet. As an office, the Chancellery acts to facilitate government policy between the prime minister and the ministers, serves as the premier's support staff, and distributes the administration's information. Additionally in supporting the cabinet, the Chancellery also houses various executive departments answerable directly to the prime minister outside of the council of ministers, including the Economic Council, the Protection Office, and the Civil Service Department.

The official residence of the prime minister is Willa Parkowa, located several minutes' walk from the Chancellery next to Łazienki Park. However, the previous Prime Minister Donald Tusk chose to reside in the coastal city of Sopot, near his native Gdańsk in Pomeranian Voivodeship.

The prime minister receives security from the Government Protection Bureau (Biuro Ochrony Rządu) while in office, as well as for six months after departing from the Chancellery.

List of Polish prime ministers

Since the inception of the Third Republic, sixteen individuals have occupied the post. The shortest-serving premier was the first government of Waldemar Pawlak, lasting for 35 days between June and July 1992. Pawlak is also the only prime minister to occupy the position twice. The longest-serving prime minister was Donald Tusk, who held the premiership continuously from 16 November 2007 to 22 September 2014. To date, three women, Hanna Suchocka, Ewa Kopacz and Beata Szydło, have served as premier. Suchocka, along with Tadeusz Mazowiecki and Jerzy Buzek, are the only Polish premiers, as of yet, to be invited into the Club of Madrid.

See also
Deputy Prime Minister of the Republic of Poland
Cabinet of Poland
President of Poland
Sejm
Senat
List of Polish monarchs

Notes

References

Works cited

Other resources
Constitution of the Republic of Poland (in English)

External links

The Chancellery of the Prime Minister

 
1918 establishments in Poland